Clouds Hill is a historic house museum at 4157 Post Road in Warwick, Rhode Island.  It is located on the estate formerly known as Cedar Hill, a country estate built 1871-77 as a wedding present for Elizabeth Ives Slater Reed by her father, William S. Slater.  The main mansion house is a large Gothic Revival structure, designed by noted Providence architect William R. Walker, and is one of his few surviving large-scale residential designs.  Both the Slaters and Reeds were leading industrial textile magnates in Rhode Island, and the property contains many examples of high quality Victorian-era workmanship, including a distinctive Egyptian-themed room.  The estate was occupied by four generations of Reed descendants, and was converted to a museum in 2004.  It was listed on the National Register of Historic Places in 2014.  The museum is open by appointment, or when events are scheduled.

See also
National Register of Historic Places listings in Kent County, Rhode Island

External links
 Official Website of Clouds Hill Victorian House Museum

References

Houses completed in 1877
Houses on the National Register of Historic Places in Rhode Island
Houses in Warwick, Rhode Island
Historic house museums in Rhode Island
Museums in Kent County, Rhode Island
National Register of Historic Places in Kent County, Rhode Island
Women's museums in the United States
1877 establishments in Rhode Island